Horton and Wraysbury is an electoral ward represented by two councillors (John Lenton and Colin Rayner of the Conservative Party) in the Royal Borough of Windsor and Maidenhead.  Nationally, the ward forms part of the UK Parliamentary constituency of Windsor and is represented by Adam Afriyie of the Conservative Party.

The ward comprises the Queen Mother Reservoir.

When the electoral register was updated following the 2011 annual canvass, there were 3,875 voters appearing on the roll for the ward.

Electorate

The number of registered voters (British, Irish, European Union and Commonwealth citizens aged 16 or over) appearing on the electoral roll published for the ward are as follows:

 1 December 2009: 3,745 electors
 1 December 2011: 3,875 electors

Polling stations

There are two polling stations within the ward - one inside the Village Hall in Wraysbury and the other in the Champney Hall in Horton.

Royal Borough representation
The two seats for the councillor representing the ward in the Royal Borough are determined by the Multi-member plurality system (the two candidate who receive the plurality of the votes cast).  Royal Borough elections are held every four years.

Past election results

National representation

Between 1983 and 1997, the ward was part of the UK Parliamentary constituency of Windsor and Maidenhead which was continually held by the Conservative Party.

Since 1997, the ward has formed part of the UK Parliamentary constituency of Windsor.  The seat has been held by Adam Afriyie of the Conservative Party since 2005.

See also
Windsor and Maidenhead local elections

References

Wards of the Royal Borough of Windsor and Maidenhead